Jose Garcia is a game designer who has worked primarily on role-playing games.

Career
Daedalus Games began when Robin Laws approached Jose Garcia in 1993 with an idea for a Hong Kong Action Cinema RPG; Garcia liked the idea, but he made his own RPG Nexus: The Infinite City his first priority; Daedalus published it in 1994 with Garcia as the main designer and developer, with Laws, Bruce Baugh, and Rob Heinsoo as additional authors. However, Garcia was also interested in promoting the setting that Laws was working on, which was first used as a basis of a collectible card game Daedalus published as Shadowfist (1995), and subsequently in Laws' Feng Shui RPG. When the CCG market crashed in 1997, the staff of Daedalus were laid off or quit, leaving Jose Garcia and his sister Maria as the only people working for the company. A few years later the company entered bankruptcy protection and sold off its intellectual properties, after which Garcia moved to Europe and left the gaming industry.

References

External links
 

Canadian game designers
Living people
Role-playing game designers
Year of birth missing (living people)